Lakhdar is a given name and may refer to:

Lakhdar Adjali (born 1972), Algerian football manager and former player
Lakhdar Belloumi (born 1958), former Algerian football player and manager
Lakhdar Bentaleb (born 1988), Algerian football player
Lakhdar Boumediene, citizen of Bosnia and Herzegovina, held in the United States Guantanamo Bay detention camps
Lakhdar Brahimi (born 1934), Algerian diplomat, served as the United Nations and Arab League Special Envoy to Syria until 2014
Lafif Lakhdar, French-Tunisian writer and journalist
Ziad Lakhdar, Tunisian politician
Mohammed Lakhdar-Hamina (born 1930), Algerian film director and screenwriter
Mohamed Lakhdar Maougal, Algerian philosopher
Lakhdar Ben Tobbal (1923–2010), former Algerian resistance fighter

See also
Sidi Lakhdar District, district in Mostaganem Province, Algeria
Bekkouche Lakhdar, town and commune in Skikda Province in northeastern Algeria
Jbel Lakhdar, small mountain or hill in Morocco
Kef Lakhdar, town and commune in Médéa Province, Algeria
Loued Lakhdar, small town and rural commune in Morocco
Sidi Lakhdar, town in the Mostaganem Province, Algeria
Sidi Lakhdar, Mostaganem, town and commune in Mostaganem Province, Algeria
Oued lakhdar, town and commune in Tlemcen Province in northwestern Algeria
Lakhdar Brahimi Syrian peace plan, joint UN-Arab League peace mission headed by Lakhdar Brahimi
Lakhdaria